First Reformed is a 2017 American drama film written and directed by Paul Schrader. It stars Ethan Hawke, Amanda Seyfried, and Cedric the Entertainer (credited as Cedric Kyles), and follows a Protestant minister faced with questions of faith and morality while serving as pastor of a dwindling historical church.

First Reformed was screened in the main competition section of the 74th Venice International Film Festival on August 31, 2017, and was theatrically released in the United States on May 18, 2018, by A24, where it grossed $3.4 million in its theatrical run. The film was praised by critics for Hawke's performance and Schrader's screenplay and direction. Both the National Board of Review and American Film Institute listed it as one of the Top 10 Films of 2018, with the former also awarding Schrader the award for Best Original Screenplay. At the Independent Spirit Awards, the film received nominations for Best Film, Best Male Lead (Hawke), Best Director and Best Screenplay.  At the Critics' Choice Movie Awards, the film received two nominations for Best Actor and Best Original Screenplay.

Accolades

Notes

See also
 2017 in film

References

External links 
 

Lists of accolades by film